Samuel Herrick may refer to:

 Samuel Herrick (politician) (1779–1852), U.S. Representative from Ohio
 Samuel Herrick (astronomer) (1911–1974), American astronomer